Hibbertia desmophylla is a species of flowering plant in the family Dilleniaceae and is endemic to the south-west of Western Australia. It is a sprawling or erect, hairy shrub with spreading, densely clustered, linear leaves and yellow flowers with eleven to thirteen stamens.

Description
Flowering has been recorded from September to February.

Taxonomy
This species was first formally described in 1863 by George Bentham who gave it the name Candollea desmophylla in Flora Australiensis from specimens collected by Augustus Oldfield near the Murchison River. In 1880, Ferdinand von Mueller changed the name to Hibbertia desmophylla in Fragmenta phytographiae Australiae. The specific epithet (desmophylla) means "halter-leaved", referring to the arrangement of the leaves around the flowers.

Distribution and habitat
Hibbertia desmophylla grows in sandy soil in heath, shrubland and woodland from near the Murchison River to the Moore River National Park in the Geraldton Sandplains biogeographic region in the south-west of Western Australia.

Conservation status
Hibbertia desmophylla is classified as "not threatened" by the Government of Western Australia Department of Parks and Wildlife.

See also
List of Hibbertia species

References

desmophylla
Flora of Western Australia
Plants described in 1863
Taxa named by George Bentham